Zorig Foundation (Mongolian: Зориг Сан) is a Mongolian non-profit, non-governmental organization (NGO) established in October 1998 after the assassination of Mongolian pro-democracy politician Zorig Sanjaasuren.  The Zorig Foundation seeks to spread democratic values in Mongolian society; strengthen human rights, and social justice; as well as improve the system of transparency and accountability of the government to the public. In order to meet the above objectives, the Zorig Foundation concentrates its programs in three areas: Youth and Education, Good Governance, and Community Building.

Early history
Zorig Sanjaasuren (Mongolian: Санжаасүрэнгийн Зориг, 20 April 1962 – 2 October 1998) was a prominent Mongolian politician and leader of the country's 1990 democratic revolution. He is called the "Golden Magpie of Democracy" (Mongolian: Ардчиллын алтан хараацай, Ardchillyn altan kharaatsai). He was murdered in 1998 and yet still his murder remains unsolved. After his death, his sister Oyun entered politics and founded the Civil Will Party along with the Zorig Foundation.

Mission
The foundation aims to spread democratic values in the society, strengthening human rights, freedom and social justice, and promoting transparency. The foundation identifies three broad areas of focus in order to complete the principal objectives aforementioned. The areas are Good Governance, Youth and Education, and Community Development. A number of project initiatives are undertaken by Zorig Foundation to promote the three components around Mongolia.

Good governance

Background

The good governance programs aim to improve the system of transparency and accountability of the government to the public. Since 1998, Zorig Foundation has implemented numerous anti-corruption, monitoring, and accountability projects. Currently, they have a project on the oral histories of the democratic revolution of 1990 to record firsthand accounts from key players of the democratic revolution.

Projects: past and present
International Conference on Good Governance in collaboration with the International Republican Institute and the Asian Democracy and Reform Association  /2001/
Round table discussion between leading economists, policy makers and journalists on “The privatization of high-value companies” /1999/
In collaboration with the State Emergency Commission and the Governor’s Offices of Aimags, Zorig Foundation prepared a TV and radio series with 12 episodes called “Today or Never”/2001/
The “Minority Media” project established a press working team at the State Parliament to publicize the stance and viewpoints of minority groups in Parliament and supported the minority newspaper ‘Express Times’ by supplying them with equipment /2003/
In collaboration with the Constitutional Court of Mongolia, the foundation published “My Constitution, My Freedom”, a comic book with simplifications of the concepts of freedom and human rights in Article 16 of the Constitution of Mongolia /2005/
Robert Dahl’s book “On Democracy”, translated by scholars Gankhuyag D., and Enkhbat Ch., was printed and distributed free of charge to the public /2004/
Within the scope of the Asia Foundation’s good governance program, Zorig Foundation carried out research and gave recommendations on the “Capacity building of research in the lawmaking process”  /2005/
“Extractive Industry Transparency Initiative (EITI)”- Zorig Foundation supported the EITI by being a member of the organizing committee of the ‘Publish What You Pay’ NGO coalition. In order to gain the support and understanding of the public, they printed pamphlets and produced short TV clips regarding the initiative. The Foundation also translated two chapters of the book ‘Escaping the Resource Curse’ and distributed the copies.

Monitoring

In a concerted effort to promote lawful action and discourage corruption, the Zorig Foundation has at multiple times embarked on monitoring projects to curb lawlessness in government.

Along with a research team from the National University of Mongolia, the Zorig Foundation conducted a monitoring project on the National Anti-Corruption Program approved in 2002. The study involved 9 Ministries and 16 Aimags, and the report was distributed to the public /2004/
Within the state services monitoring program announced by the Open Society Forum:
Monitoring was done on customs office operations in Altanbulag, Zamiin-Uud and Ulaanbaatar /2006/
Conducted monitoring of Government scholarships and loans for university students /2007/ 
Conducted monitoring on the spending of donations on disaster relief /2008/

Youth and education

Background

Zorig Foundation's projects in Youth and Education revolve around their provision of numerous scholarships and programs varying from domestic scholarships, to university students, to educational programs for young professionals and school-age children, reskilling programs for marginalized youth. The Foundation implements numerous Scholarship Programs aimed at helping academically talented students from financially disadvantaged families obtain higher education degrees. Another example is the School Pairing Program; under this joint Ulaanbaatar/Denver Sister Cities Committee program, high schools began a series of exchanges involving both students and teachers in four American and Mongolian communities, with the primary goal of promoting cross-cultural awareness and understanding between Mongolians and Americans. Zorig Foundation also runs development programs for young professionals.  The two most notable of these programs is the Young Leadership Program (YLP) and the Environmental Fellowship Program (EFP).

Scholarships

The Zorig Foundation provides scholarships to Mongolian students studying domestically. Each scholarship is provided through a partnership with the Foundation and various organizations and companies, such as Swiss Agency for Development and Cooperation, Rio Tinto and The Asia Foundation  seeking to fund students' education. Zorig Foundation establishes, manages and selects students.

Community development

Background

Zorig Foundation's Community Development programs aim to assist low-income and vulnerable groups in Mongolia. Their projects mainly focus on empowering the urban poor of Ulaanbaatar. Projects range from improving access to social services to helping create a better sense of community for residents.

Projects

Implemented a project in Umnugobi and Dornod Aimags that provided over 50 families with enough livestock to become a source of sustenance.
Helped rural citizens to grow vegetables, manually produce leather and cloth, make national shoes and saddles, make carpentry, domestically manufacture felt and felt products. They also distributed the necessary equipment and technology.
Implemented a project to build 4 wells in the ger district areas of Ulaanbaatar.
In collaboration with the 2660 District of Japan, they distributed 16 sets of injection apparatus to the Infant Research Center.
With funding and support from the Ensemble Le Pegase and the Rotary Club of Osaka Central, Zorig Foundation gave 5-walled gers to 48 families in Ulaanbaatar with no housing.
Organized a seminar on ‘How to overcome poverty in Mongolia: the current trends and needs of future research’ in collaboration with the German Economic Research Institute /March 2009/
Successfully confirmed the registration of 11,222 residents of Gobi-Altai, Zavhan, Hovd, Uvs, Bayanulgii, Bayanhongor Aimags and Songinohairhan, Bayanzurh, Nalaikh, Bagakhangai, Baganuur Districts of Ulaanbaatar, who were extremely poor and grouped under the 1st, 3rd and 4th groupings of the social welfare program run by the Ministry of Social Welfare and Labor /July 2009/

Organizational structure
The Head of the Foundation is S. Oyun, a prominent Mongolian politician who is also the Director of External Affairs at Green Climate Fund. Its current Executive Director is Maralmaa Munkh-Achit. The full board of directors is as follows:

Oyun S.				Head of Zorig Foundation; 
Badamdamdin R.		Former Member of Parliament;
Badamdash D.			CEO, Mongolian Airlines Group;
Batbayar N.			Member of Parliament;
Batbold S.				Member of Parliament;
Bayartsogt S.			Member of Parliament; 
Medree B.				Vice President, Mongolian Bankers Association;
Otgonbayar Ch.	        Head of the Foundation for the Empowerment of Rural Women; 
Chimeddorj T.			Senior Diplomatic Officer;
Sukhjargalmaa D.		Independent Advisor;
Enkhtuya O.			Country Director, The Nature Conservancy.

The Foundation also has an auditing board in order to ensure the transparency of the organization. Its members are as follows:

Bold M.				CEO, TenGer Financial Group;
Solongo J.				Director of Mongolian Cinema Company; 
Sukhbaatar D.			CEO, Susan Ltd.

References 

Political organizations based in Mongolia
Organizations established in 1998
1998 establishments in Mongolia